A RF distribution amplifier  is a high−performance distribution amplifier for analog RF signals. It takes one RF signal and carries it to multiple identical outputs.

Characteristics
 High bandwidth  
 RF gain

References

electronic amplifiers